The 2011 Waikato Bay of Plenty Magic season saw Waikato Bay of Plenty Magic compete in the 2011 ANZ Championship. With a team coached by Noeline Taurua and captained by Laura Langman, Magic finished the regular season second behind Queensland Firebirds. They subsequently lost to Firebirds in the major semi-final and to Northern Mystics in the preliminary final. Magic finished the season third overall.

The 2011 season was the last season Magic played their Hamilton home games at the Mystery Creek Events Centre. From 2012, their Hamilton games will be played at Claudelands Arena.

Players

Player movements

Roster

Pre-season
Waikato Bay of Plenty Magic and Northern Mystics played a five-quarter match  during pre-season.

Regular season

Fixtures and results
Round 1
Waikato Bay of Plenty Magic received a bye.
Round 2

Round 3

Round 4

Round 5

Round 6

Round 7

Round 8

Round 9

Round 10 

Round 11

Round 12

Notes
  The Round 4 match between Canterbury Tactix and Waikato Bay of Plenty Magic was originally scheduled to be played in Christchurch. However following the 2011 Christchurch earthquake, the match was moved to Rotorua. It was still regarded as a "home" match for Tactix.

Final table

Finals

Major semifinal

Preliminary final

Statistics

References

2011
2011 ANZ Championship season
2011 in New Zealand netball